Germanwings GmbH was a German low-cost airline wholly owned by Lufthansa which operated under the Eurowings brand. It was based in Cologne with hubs at Cologne Bonn Airport, Stuttgart Airport, Hamburg Airport, Berlin Tegel Airport, Munich Airport and further bases at Hannover Airport and Dortmund Airport.

Germanwings operated independently as Lufthansa's low-cost carrier until October 2015, when Lufthansa decided to fully transfer the brand identity of its low cost short haul-product to Eurowings. After 2016, Germanwings operated as a wet lease operator for its sister company Eurowings, with the Germanwings branding being phased out at this time. The IATA code "4U" continued to operate under the Eurowings brand until March 2018, when it was abandoned and replaced with the Eurowings designator EW. Germanwings was closed in April 2020 as part of a broad restructuring.

History

Early years

In 1997, Eurowings set up a low-cost department, which became a separate company under the name Germanwings on 27 October 2002. On 7 December 2005, the airline signed an agreement to purchase 18 Airbus A319-100 aircraft with a further 12 options, with deliveries scheduled from July 2006 until 2008.

During winter 2004–2005, Germanwings leased two Boeing 717-200s from Aerolíneas de Baleares to test the aircraft type, but no order was made afterwards.

In 2008, initial plans were made to merge Germanwings, Eurowings and TUIfly into one airline to compete with Air Berlin and its subsidiary LTU in the German market and with easyJet and Ryanair on international routes. However, these plans never realized. Instead, Germanwings became a wholly owned subsidiary of Lufthansa on 1 January 2009.

Takeover of Lufthansa routes from 2012
In 2012, Lufthansa announced its plans to transfer point-to-point shorthaul flights operating from cities other than Frankfurt and Munich from Lufthansa to Germanwings. Therefore, the company received a revised corporate design. The transfer of Lufthansa's shorthaul routes occurred between spring 2013 and autumn 2014; Düsseldorf Airport was the last base transferred from March 2014.

As part of the 2013 restructuring and relaunch of Germanwings, around 30 Lufthansa aircraft were to be added to Germanwings' fleet of 33 aircraft. Additionally, the 23 aircraft currently operated by Eurowings for Lufthansa flights not flying out of Frankfurt and Munich were to join Germanwings. The new Germanwings was to operate around 90 aircraft.

The airline had a long-standing dispute with the Vereinigung Cockpit union, which demanded a plan in which pilots can retire at the age of 55 and retain 60% of their pay, which parent Lufthansa insists was not affordable. Germanwings pilots staged a nationwide strike in support of their demands in April 2014, which lasted 3 days. The pilots staged a six-hour strike in September 2014. Simultaneous strikes were staged by Lufthansa pilots.

By the end of 2014, all of Lufthansa's national routes and international traffic to and from Germany - except flights to and from Frankfurt and Munich and the routes from Düsseldorf to Newark and Chicago - were transferred to Germanwings. The last route to be transferred was Düsseldorf-Zurich on 8 January 2015.

Integration into Eurowings from 2015

In January 2015, Lufthansa Group announced that it would discontinue the Germanwings brand and replace it with Eurowings starting in late 2015.

On 25 October 2015, Eurowings took over 55 routes previously operated under the Germanwings brand. The first Germanwings bases to be mostly taken over by Eurowings were Düsseldorf Airport, Hamburg Airport - at both of which Eurowings already operated on behalf of Germanwings - and Cologne Bonn Airport.

Lufthansa announced in October 2015 that Germanwings' own website would be dissolved and redirected to Eurowings by January 2016 as part of their merger. However, Germanwings continued to operate as a company. From that date, Eurowings became solely responsible for all sales under the Germanwings brand. In January 2016, Germanwings' social media profiles, such as  those on Facebook and YouTube, were renamed Eurowings, while germanwings.com was redirected to eurowings.com. However, Germanwings continued to operate under its own flight numbers, but used the Eurowings brand.

In December 2016, it was announced that Germanwings would retire 20 aircraft during 2017 without replacement due to Lufthansa's new wet-lease deal with Air Berlin which also provided services for Eurowings. It was reported that the Air Berlin aircraft were newer and cheaper to operate than those of Germanwings.

In August 2017, it was announced that Germanwings would abandon its own IATA code 4U by 25 March 2018. Since then, it has used Eurowings' EW code on for all operations, which are already carried out under the Eurowings brand.

In October 2019, the Pristina base, which had been operated by Germanwings since June 2019, was transferred to Eurowings Europe. In return, Germanwings took over the German base in Munich which had been operated by its sister airline.

On 7 April 2020, Lufthansa announced that it would be shutting down Germanwings, partly due to the large travel ban during the COVID-19 pandemic.

Corporate affairs

Service concept
Germanwings had offered three fare types since 2013. Basic was no-frills and offered no inclusive catering and only hand luggage. Best included hold baggage, inclusive snacks and drinks as well as access to some lounges for tier members of Miles&More. Smart and Best more or less corresponded to the Lufthansa service offered on the routes taken over by Germanwings. The fleet was only equipped with economy class.

Germanwings offered Sky Bistro (Bord Shop in German), a buy on board food and drinks programme. The airline provided an inflight magazine, a bi-monthly German and English magazine called GW. While the primary editorial focus was rooted in Germanwings destinations, the content was not exclusively about travel.

Germanwings booking service provided Blind Booking, a unique option that allowed passengers to choose one of Germanwings' base airports, select a category of destination (e.g. Party, Gay-friendly or Culture) and then purchase a round-trip ticket via a random lottery process from among the cities in the category. Such tickets were often priced lower than the corresponding ticket to the same destination, and Germanwings e-mails its customers with details of their destination shortly after the purchase.

Business trends
Germanwings had been wholly owned by Lufthansa since 1 January 2009; formal reporting since then had been within the Group Accounts. From 2012, Germanwings figures had been reported only within the 'Lufthansa Passenger Airline Group', and have not generally been available separately. The key known trends for Germanwings are shown below (as at year ending 31 December):

In line with Lufthansa's declared business strategy, the transfer of European non-hub traffic from Lufthansa Passenger Airlines to Germanwings continued in 2014 and was completed successfully on 7 January 2015. (The increase in 2013 and 2014 figures was due to this intervening transfer of aircraft and routes from Lufthansa.)

Destinations

Codeshare agreements
Germanwings had codeshare agreements with the following airlines:

 Air Canada
 All Nippon Airways
 Austrian Airlines
 Brussels Airlines
 Lufthansa
 Swiss International Air Lines
 United Airlines

Fleet

Germanwings operated the following aircraft:

Special liveries
Germanwings used several different special liveries. Some aircraft had special liveries promoting German cities (e.g. the Bearbus paint scheme inspired by the coat of arms of Berlin), or as advertisements (e.g. a pink livery for T-Mobile). Those were abandoned during the 2013 rebranding.

Incidents and accidents

As of the merger, Germanwings had been involved in one major incident, which resulted in 150 fatalities. On 24 March 2015, an Airbus A320-211 with registration D-AIPX was operating Flight 9525 from Barcelona to Düsseldorf when it crashed in the south of France near Digne-les-Bains, with no survivors. The flight was carrying 144 passengers, two pilots and four cabin crew. German investigators concluded that 27-year-old co-pilot Andreas Lubitz had deliberately crashed the plane, while alone in the cockpit. Lubitz took time off from his flight training for several months and informed the Flight Training Pilot School in 2009 of a "previous episode of severe depression". He later completed the training. Prior to his training as a commercial pilot, he was also treated for suicidal tendencies.

Following the incident, the European Aviation Safety Agency (EASA) made a recommendation to airlines that two authorized people must be present in the cockpit at all times. In coordination with the German aviation authority, other German airlines and the German aviation industry association, the airlines of the Lufthansa Group implemented a policy requiring this. However, by 2016, the EASA stopped recommending the two-person rule, instead advising airlines to perform a risk assessment and decide for themselves whether to use the rule. Germanwings and other German airlines dropped the rule in 2017.

See also 
 List of defunct airlines of Germany

References

External links

Official website

Defunct airlines of Germany
Airlines established in 2002
Airlines disestablished in 2020
German brands
Defunct European low-cost airlines
Companies based in Cologne
2002 establishments in Germany
Lufthansa
German companies disestablished in 2020
German companies established in 2002
Airlines disestablished due to the COVID-19 pandemic